Christology: A Biblical, Historical, and Systematic Study of Jesus is a 2009 theological book by the Australian Jesuit priest and academic Gerald O'Collins. This work was originally published in 1995 with the title Christology: A Biblical, Historical, and Systematic Study of Jesus Christ, but the author thoroughly revised the whole text in 2009 to take account of the numerous biblical, historical, and systematic studies of Jesus that appeared following its first edition.

Synopsis
In this revised and updated second edition of his account of systematic Christology, O'Collins critically examines the more authoritative biblical and historical scholarship before confronting some key questions about orthodox faith and free will as applicable to Jesus in his person, being, and activity. In seeking to clarify the essential truths about him, the book investigates who Jesus was/is and what he did/does.

O'Collins attempts to answer some difficult questions: Was Jesus both human and divine? If so, how is that possible and not a blatant contradiction in terms? "Surely - he writes - we cannot attribute to one and the same subject the attributes of being simultaneously finite (as a human being) and infinite (as Son of God)?" The author proposes that one should envisage Jesus' revealing and redeeming 'work' as having an impact not only on all men and women of all times and places, but also on the whole created cosmos. Recognising the difficulty in describing or even minimally explaining Christ's salvific 'work', the book is built around the resurrection of the crucified Jesus, highlights love as the key to redemption, and proposes a synthesis of the divine presence through Jesus.

The second edition includes fresh material on current discussions in the study of Christology: the use of 'near-death' and bereavement experiences as analogies to the post-resurrection appearances of Christ; contemporary philosophical theology and the case for the theological coherence of the Incarnation; the universal redemptive activity of Christ; and the place and possibilities of 'presence' as an organising category in Christology.

Furthermore, the author covers specific theological approaches including Martin Luther's theology of the cross and liberation theology.

Contents

Chapter 1 - Some Major Challenges
History
Philosophy
Language
Content, Emphases, and Context
Chapter 2 - The Jewish Matrix
Five Titles
Two Closing Comments
Chapter 3 - The Human History
Some Preliminaries
Proclaimer of the Kingdom
Personal Authority
Son of Man
Self-Identity
Faced with Death
Conclusion
Chapter 4 - The Resurrection
The Claim
First Ground for the Claim: The Appearances
The Appearances Challenged
A Secondary Sign
Other Factors
The Resurrection as Revealing
Resurrection as Redemptive
God's Activity
Chapter 5 - The Son of God
Dating the Title
The Title's Meaning
Naming the Son of God
Chapter 6 - Lord, Saviour, God, and Spirit
Lord
Further Appropriations
Saviour and God
Spirit
Trinity
Chapter 7 - To the First Council of Constantinople
Four Queries
Ambiguities and Intimations
Divinity and Humanity
Chapter 8 - Ephesus, Chalcedon, and Beyond
After Chalcedon
Into the Middle Ages
Chapter 9 - Medieval and Modern Christology
Thomas Aquinas
To the Reformation
The Background for Today
Chapter 10 - Divine and Human
Divinity
Humanity
Divine and Human
One Divine Person
Personal Pre-existence
Further Issues
Chapter 11 - Faith, Holiness, and Virginal Conception
The Faith of Jesus
The Sinlessness of Christ
The Grace of Christ
The Virginal Conception
Chapter 12 - Redeemer
The Human Need
Christ's Saving Work
Saved by Love
Chapter 13 - Universal Redeemer
The Redeemer of All
Grounds for a Universal Claim
The Salvation of the Non-evangelized
A Coda
Chapter 14 - The Possibilities of Presence
Chapters 2-13 on Christ's Presence
A Philosophy of Presence
The Revealing and Saving Presence of Christ
Three Further Advantages
Conclusion
Bibliography - Index of Names - Biblical Index

See also

 Christian theology
 Jesuism
 Jews for Jesus
 List of books about Jesus
 List of founders of religious traditions
 List of people claimed to be Jesus
 List of people who have been considered deities
 Redeemer (Christianity)
 Unknown years of Jesus

References

External links
Review by RBL 2010, Society of Biblical Literature.
Christology on Goodreads. Retrieved 31 October 2012
Encyclopædia Britannica, Christology - full access article
 "Jesus Christ." Encyclopædia Britannica. 2009. Encyclopædia Britannica Online. 12 Nov. 2009
 From Jesus to Christ: The First Christians — documentary about Jesus' life and the early Church.

2009 non-fiction books
Christology
Catholic theology and doctrine
Christian theology books
Religious philosophical literature